Raymond Wright may refer to:

 Raymond R. Wright (1945–1999), United States Army soldier and Medal of Honor recipient
 Raymond R. Wright (USMC) (1892–1964), United States Marine Corps officer
 Raymond Wright (rower) (born 1947), American rower